Katharine Ross is an American actress whose career began in the 1960s, with her feature debut being Shenandoah (1965), followed by roles in the comedies Mister Buddwing (1965) and The Singing Nun (1966), and the psychological thriller Games (1967). Ross garnered international acclaim for her role in Mike Nichols' The Graduate (1967), for which she won the Golden Globe Award for New Star of the Year, and was nominated for the Academy Award and BAFTA Award for Best Supporting Actress.

In 1969, Ross won the BAFTA Award for Best Actress for her roles in both Butch Cassidy and the Sundance Kid and Tell Them Willie Boy Is Here. Subsequent roles included the lead in the horror film The Stepford Wives (1975), and the drama Voyage of the Damned (1976), for which she won the Golden Globe Award for Best Supporting Actress. She then co-starred with Sam Elliott—who subsequently became her husband—in the horror film The Legacy (1978), followed by the science fiction film The Final Countdown (1980) and in Richard Brooks' comedy thriller Wrong Is Right (1982). From 1985 to 1987, Ross starred in the television series The Colbys. Beginning in the 1990s, Ross went into semi-retirement, though she continued to occasionally appear in television and film roles. In 2001, she had a supporting role as a therapist of the title character in Richard Kelly's Donnie Darko, which went on to amass a cult following.

Film

Television

Stage

References

Sources

Actress filmographies
American filmographies